

Given name
 Taşkın Aksoy (born 1967), German-Turkish football manager and former player
 Taşkın Çalış (born 1993), Turkish footballer
 Taskin Ahmed (born 1995), Bangladeshi cricketer

Surname
 Dilan Yeşim Taşkın (born 2001), Turkish-Austrian footballer
 Émile-Alexandre Taskin (1853-1897), French operatic baritone, descendant of Pascal
 Ilter Tashkin (born 1994), German-Azerbaijani footballer
 Pascal Joseph Taskin (1723-1793), Belgian-French harpsichord and piano maker

Arabic-language surnames
French-language surnames
Azerbaijani-language surnames
Turkish masculine given names